Mount Eagle is a mountain in County Kerry, Ireland.

Geography 
The mountain is part of Mountains of the Central Dingle Peninsula and is the 419th highest in Ireland. Mount Eagle is located not faraway from Slea Head (Ceann Sléibhe), the most south-westerly point of the peninsula, and is connected with mount Brandon by a ridge of lower hills. On the mountain's top stands a trig point.

History 
The mountain summit was the first European bit of land seen by Charles Lindbergh after his 1927 plane voyage across the Atlantic Ocean.

Access to the summit 
Mount Eagle summit can be reached with a medium walk from Ventry Harbour. From the top of the mountain there is a good view of the neighbouring coast and the Blasket Islands.

See also

List of mountains in Ireland
 List of Marilyns in Ireland

References

External links 
 Map of a looped walk to Mount Eagle 

Mountains and hills of County Kerry
Marilyns of Ireland